Kotelnikovo is a rural locality (a village) in Spasskoye Rural Settlement, Vologodsky District, Vologda Oblast, Russia. The population was 6 as of 2002.

Geography 
The distance to Vologda is 12 km, to Nepotyagovo is 2 km. Zhilino, Tropino, Mozhayskoye, Konishchevo, Kudrino are the nearest rural localities.

References 

Rural localities in Vologodsky District